The 2012 Italian motorcycle Grand Prix was the ninth round of the 2012 Grand Prix motorcycle racing season. It took place on the weekend of 13–15 July 2012 at the Mugello Circuit.

Classification

MotoGP

Moto2

Notes:
 — Johann Zarco was given a fifteen-place grid penalty for riding in an irresponsible manner, following a collision with Pol Espargaró.

Moto3

Championship standings after the race (MotoGP)
Below are the standings for the top five riders and constructors after round nine has concluded.

Riders' Championship standings

Constructors' Championship standings

 Note: Only the top five positions are included for both sets of standings.

References

Italian motorcycle Grand Prix
Italian
Motorcycle Grand Prix
Italian motorcycle Grand Prix